Stefán Númi Stefánsson (born 1 August 1995) is an Icelandic professional American football player, where he plays as an Offensive tackle for Potsdam Royals in the German Football League.  Stefán is also a former basketball player.

Early years
Stefán grew up in Egilsstaðir where he played basketball for Höttur for several seasons, including in the Icelandic top-tier Úrvalsdeild karla. He was part of the second-tier 1. deild karla team with Höttur from 2015.

Football Career
He started his American football career in Denmark with
Aarhus Tigers in 2019 in the National Ligaen. He signed with Mallorca Voltors in Spain for the 2020 season. The season was cut short due to the COVID-19 pandemic in Spain. 
Stefán went back to play with Aarhus Tigers in summer of 2020 but before the season could finish, Covid unfortunately shut down the lague.

In 2021, he played for Swarco Raiders and helped the team win the Austrian Bowl. 

In June 2022, Stefán signed with the Potsdam Royals of the German Football League. Potsdam Royals went through the 2022 regular season undefeated 10-0.   The team won both their Quarterfinal game vs. Straubing Spiders and the Semifinal game vs. Cologne Crocodiles. Royals played for the first time in the team history, on 22 October 2022, in the German Bowl where they faced the five time champions Schwäbisch Hall Unicorns. Unicorns won the game 44–27.

Trophies and awards

American football
 Austrian Football League: 2021
 German Football League - North division: 2022

Basketball
 1. deild karla: 2015

References

External links
Basketball statistics at Icelandic Basketball Association

1995 births
Living people
German Football League players
Icelandic players of American football
Stefan Numi Stefansson
Stefan Numi Stefansson
Stefan Numi Stefansson